The Utah Tech Trailblazers women's basketball team represents Utah Tech University  known as Dixie State) in St. George, Utah. Starting in 2020–21 season, the Trailblazers play in Division I and are members of the Western Athletic Conference. Previously, the school's team participated in the Rocky Mountain Athletic Conference, at the Division II level of the NCAA. The team announced January 5, 2021, that they would suspend their 2020–2021 season indefinitely, in wake of continued cancellations due to COVID-19.

The Trailblazers are currently led by head coach J. D. Gustin, starting his fifth year.

The team plays its games at the Burns Arena on its campus in St. George.

In 2022, the university changed their name from Dixie State University, to Utah Tech University. While the legal change doesn't occur until July 1, 2022, the school has already began using Utah Tech branding in all sites, materials, recruiting etc. The "Trailblazers" nickname will not be affected. The 2021–2022 was the last Trailblazers team to use the "Dixie State" name.

Postseason

NCAA Division II tournament results
The Trailblazers, then known as the Red Storm, made one appearance in the NCAA Division II women's basketball tournament. They had a combined record of 0–1.

Season-by-season record
{| class="wikitable" style="text-align:center"

|- align="center"

References

External links
 Official website
 Notice of Cancellation of 2020–2021 Season